Antonín Brabec may refer to:
 Antonín Brabec (canoeist)
 Antonín Brabec (rugby union)